Steven Ernest Bernard Zaillian (born January 30, 1953) is an American screenwriter, film director and producer. He won an Academy Award, a Golden Globe Award and a BAFTA Award for his screenplay Schindler's List (1993) and has earned Oscar nominations for the films Awakenings, Gangs of New York, Moneyball and The Irishman. He was presented with the Distinguished Screenwriter Award at the 2009 Austin Film Festival and the Laurel Award for Screenwriting Achievement from the Writers Guild of America in 2011. Zaillian is the founder of Film Rites, a film production company. In 2016, he created, wrote and directed the HBO limited series The Night Of.

Early life
Steven Zaillian was born in Fresno, California, the son of Jim Zaillian, a radio news reporter. Zaillian is of Armenian descent. He attended Sonoma State University, graduated from San Francisco State University in 1975 with a degree in Cinema.

Personal life

He lives in Los Angeles with his wife Elizabeth Zaillian and their two children, Nicholas and Charles Zaillian.

Career
Steven Zaillian is known for writing screenplays that often deal with tragedy and drama. Zaillian has written screenplays for many notable films.  Zaillian wrote the screenplay for the 1990 film Awakenings. His most notable work is the 1993 screenplay for the film Schindler's List, for which he won an Academy Award. The Schindler’s List screenplay was voted the 49th best screenplay of all time by the Writers Guild of America West, the 32nd best of all time by IMDb, and the 49th best by filmsite.org. Zaillian directed and wrote the 1993 film Searching for Bobby Fischer, for which he earned critical and commercial acclaim. Zaillian also wrote and directed the 1998 film A Civil Action and wrote the screenplays for films Gangs of New York in 2002, and American Gangster in 2007. In 2007, in partnership with Mandate Pictures, he signed a deal with Columbia Pictures.  Zaillian co-wrote the screenplay for Moneyball in 2011 with Aaron Sorkin. Zaillian also wrote the screenplay for the 2011 film The Girl with the Dragon Tattoo. His most recent work includes creating, directing, writing, and producing the 2016 Emmy-winning HBO miniseries The Night Of and writing the screenplay for the 2019 Netflix film The Irishman.

Filmography

Film

Television

Executive producer only
 Welcome to the Rileys (2010)
 The Cold Light of Day (2012)
 The Current War (2017)
 My Dinner with Hervé (2018)

Editor
 Breaker! Breaker! (1977)
 Kingdom of the Spiders (1977)
 Starhops (1978)

Awards

References

External links

Writings at One for the Table

1953 births
Living people
American film editors
Film producers from California
American male screenwriters
Best Adapted Screenplay Academy Award winners
Best Adapted Screenplay BAFTA Award winners
American writers of Armenian descent
Writers from Fresno, California
San Francisco State University alumni
Writers Guild of America Award winners
Film directors from California
Best Screenplay Golden Globe winners
Screenwriters from California
20th-century American screenwriters
20th-century American male writers
21st-century American screenwriters
21st-century American male writers